The 2005–06 season was Fussball Club Basel 1893's 113th in existence and the club's 12th consecutive season in the top flight of Swiss football. Werner Edelmann was confirmed as the club's chairman for the fourth successive season at the AGM. FCB played their home matches in the St. Jakob-Park, in the Basel quarter St. Alban in the south-east of the city.

Overview
Christian Gross was head coach for the seventh successive season. A number of players left the squad. Marco Zwyssig retired from active football. Sébastien Barberis was released on a free transfer, after eight years with the club and he moved on to FC Bulle. Philipp Degen transferred to Borussia Dortmund and Benjamin Huggel transferred to Eintracht Frankfurt. Goalkeeper Thomas Mandl returned to Austria and signed for Admira Wacker Mödling and defender Kléber returned to Brazil, signing for Santos. The two Argentinian strikers Christian Giménez and Julio Hernán Rossi also left the club, Giménez in August and Rossi during the winter break. Giménez parting was some what peculiar, he forced his immediate departure to the French team Olympique de Marseille by refusing to play against Werder Bremen.

Basel made a few signings before the start of the 2005–06 season. For example, forward Eduardo, who was signed permanently from Toulouse, following his successful loan spell. The young forward Felipe Caicedo was signed in from Rocafuerte Fútbol Club. Midfielders Baykal Kulaksızoğlu was signed in from FC Thun and Papa Malick Ba from CS Sfaxien, goalkeeper Louis Crayton was signed in from Concordia Basel and a number of youngsters advanced from the U-21 team including Ivan Rakitić and Zdravko Kuzmanović.

The FC Basel aims for the 2005–06 season were to retain the league title, win the cup and as well as to qualify for the UEFA Champions League group stage.

FC Basel started the season with various warm-up matches. These included teams from the Swiss lower league as well as teams from France, Croatia and the Ukraine. They played six pre-season friendlies including the Uhrencup in Grenchen, winning four matches, but losing in the Uhrencup 0–2 against 1. FC Kaiserslautern and drawing the second match in this competition 2–2 against Trabzonspor. The six mid-season friendlies all ended with a victory. 

During the winter break, the team had their traditional winter break soccer camp in La Manga, Spain. The defenders Daniel Majstorović and Kōji Nakata were brought in to replace Lyon-bound Patrick Müller and Murat Yakın who was to retire at the end of the season. The team played two games in their soccer camp, drawing 2–2 against German team Hamburger SV and beat local team Ciudad de Murcia 2–1. The other three winter break matches were played in Switzerland. Basel beat Locarno and beat Wohlen, bur lost against Rapid București. Of their 17 friendlies in this season, Basel won 13 matches, drew two and lost two.

The Campaign

Domestic league
There were ten teams competing in the top tier 2005–06 Swiss Super League. The teams played a double round-robin in the first half of the season and then another double round-robin in the second half. There were three points for a victory and one each for a draw. The champions would enter the second qualifying round of the 2006–07 UEFA Champions League. The championship runners-up and the third placed team would enter the UEFA Cup first qualifying round. The bottom placed team would be relegated, the second last team would play a play-off against relegation.

Basel's priority aim for the season was to win the league championship for the third time in a row. Despite the 3-0 defeat by FC Thun in the second round, Basel started the season well and led the championship right until the last day of the league campaign. On 26 February 2006, FC Basel broke their own club record of 52 unbeaten league games at St. Jakob Park, later extending it to 59. The unbeaten home run ended on the final day of the season with a last-minute goal from Zürich's Iulian Filipescu giving Zürich their first national championship since 1980–81. A 60th straight home league match undefeated, would have made Basel champions for third time in a row. The final score was 1-2 in favour of Zürich. The title was lost on goal difference.

The last minute loss of the Championship and the subsequent riots, the so-called Basel Hooligan Incident, meant that the club would suffer the consequences. As well as a huge fine, the first two home games of their 2006–07 season were held completely without fans, behind closer doors. The following three matches were held with just a part of the stadium capacity, without the fans from the "Muttenzer Kurve" (the eastern fan block).

Domestic cup
Basel's clear aim for the Swiss Cup was to win it. In the first round of the 2005–06 Cup Basel were drawn away against lower league team Solothurn. Basel won this 4–1, with goals from David Degen, and Eduardo and twice Mladen Petrić. In round two they were drawn away against local lower league team Old Boys. Basel won this 6–1 and here Mile Sterjovski scored four goals and Zdravko Kuzmanović scored the other two. However, despite an early goal from Julio Hernán Rossi and two further goals from Matías Delgado, Basel were defeated in the third round home tie against FC Zürich 3–4. Basel's domestic cup aim was clearly missed. Second tier Sion won the trophy at the end of the season, beating Young Boys in the final after a penalty shoot-out.

Europe

Champions League qualifying round
As Swiss champions, Basel entered the UEFA Champions League third qualifying round and their aim was to reach the group stage. However, they were drawn against German Bundesliga club Werder Bremen and they lost 4-2 on aggregate. Three goals in eight second-half minutes in the return leg swung the tie decisively in the German side's favour.

Werder Bremen (10 August 2005)
Goals in either half from David Degen and substitute Julio Hernán Rossi ensured Christian Gross's side the advantage before the return leg at the Weserstadion on 24 August. However, the German team still had every confidence of overturning the deficit, thanks to Miroslav Klose's strike on 72 minutes. Thomas Schaaf's men were behind after 27 minutes after some lax defending. Goalkeeper Andreas Reinke was stranded after Scott Chipperfield's shot had been blocked and Degen made no mistake when well placed. The wayward defending continued into the second half, allowing Argentinian striker Rossi to double the home team's advantage on 52 minutes by drilling through Reinke's legs to the obvious delight of a sell-out 29,000 crowd at St. Jakob Park. Yet the home fans were given pause for thought when Germany forward Klose pulled one back in the closing stages.

Return match (24 August 2005)
Three goals in eight second-half minutes swing the tie decisively in the German side's favour. Until the opening goal Basel had protected Pascal Zuberbühler's goal with some ease, but a fortuitous deflection unhinged their defence after 63 minutes. A clearance from the Basel defence hit Patrick Owomoyela on the chest and the ball bounced into the penalty area, Bremen striker Ivan Klasnić was quickest to react and he tapped the ball into the empty net from close range. Basel found themselves further in arrears moments later when Johan Micoud was fouled in the penalty area by Reto Zanni. Tim Borowski made no mistake, slotting the ball into the bottom left-hand corner. The home side then guaranteed their spot into the draw for the next round, with Klasnić's second goal after 72 minutes. The striker latched on to Daniel Jensen's pass to send a left-footed strike in off the post beyond Zuberbühler from 15 metres.

UEFA Cup
Subsequently Basel dropped into the 2005–06 UEFA Cup, where they met Bosnian club NK Široki Brijeg in the first round.

NK Široki Brijeg (15 September 2005, 29 September 2005)
In the first leg of the first round Basel played at home in the St. Jakob-Park and Matías Delgado scored a hat-trick as Basel won 5–0. The return match in Široki Brijeg was also won. Basel sealed a 6–0 aggregate win to qualify for the Group stage. 

Group stage
Here Basel were then drawn into Group E, alongside Strasbourg, Roma, Red Star Belgrade and Tromsø. 

RC Strasbourg (20 October 2005)
Basel lost their first home match against Strasbourg 0–2 after defender Patrick Müller was sent off for pulling down Amara Diané in the 33rd minute. Diané himself had put the guests one up in the 15th minute and fellow Ivorian Arthur Boka scored a second ten minutes later.

Red Star Belgrade (3 November 2005)
An away win against Red Star Belgrade in the second match day. Rossi ran on to a pin-point pass from Matías Delgado with just two minutes remaining as Basel vanquished memories of their 0-2 defeat by RC Strasbourg on Matchday 1. It completed a well-earned turnaround after Milan Purović had given the home side the lead midway through the first half. Basel soon drew level when Delgado converted a penalty on the half-hour mark, paving the way for a thrilling win.

Tromsø IL (1 December 2005)
The Basel side rallied from being 1-3 down after 29 minutes to secure an unlikely 4-3 win to move second, while eliminating Tromsø. Tromsø had gone ahead as early as the second minute when Lars Iver Strand headed in Ole Andreas Nilsen's cross. Basel attempted to respond and came close a minute later, only for Eduardo to header over the bar, while 60 seconds later Matías Delgado also shot wide. Petrić did equalise as he fired in a left-footed shot after Smiljanić had headed Patrick Müller's free-kick into his path. However, Tromsø regained their lead three minutes later when Ole Martin Årst collected Joachim Walltin's pass before hitting an angled shot into the net from 12 metres. After 29 minutes the visitors opened up a 3-1 lead and this time Årst was the provider, playing the ball from the right for Strand to score his second of the evening. Basel piled on the pressure in the second half but were almost caught out when Patrice Bernier's header forced a save from Pascal Zuberbühler. Delgado reduced arrears when he converted a cross from Petrić just after the hour and it was all-square six minutes later when Scott Chipperfield headed in a Julio Hernán Rossi cross. With 16 minutes remaining, Basel took the lead for the first time as David Degen collected an Eduardo pass and scored from close range. Basel secured the most unlikely of wins to move into second place in the standings.

AS Roma (14 December 2005)
An away defeat against Roma followed. Roma pressed from the very first moment and it was inevitable that Rodrigo Taddei put the home team one up after just 12 minutes. But Basel reacted and fought back. Ivan Ergić saw his header rebound from the cross bar after 25 minutes and Delgado's shot rebounded from the post just two minutes later, but the equaliser did not fall. In fact Francesco Totti put the home team two up just seconds before the half time whistle and shortly after the start of the second period Shabani Nonda added a third goal. With this three goal lead, AS Roma just tried to control the game and played just in midfield. Towards the end of the game Basel turned up their efforts and after 78 minutes Mladen Petrić pulled a goal back. But it wasn't enough to turn the game and Basel lost 1-3. Because, at the same time, Strasbourg scored the 2-2 equaliser in the fourth minute of over time against Red Star Belgrade, with some luck Basel qualified for the knock-out stages.

AS Monaco (15 February 2006)
In the round of 32 Basel were drawn against AS Monaco and the first leg of this tie was played in St. Jakob-Park. Having dropped to ninth spot in the domestic league, Monaco were eager to impress on the continental stage, but always appeared vulnerable against a solid Basel outfit. The Swiss side took control of the match from the off, and went close to breaking the deadlock in the 19th minute as Lucas Bernardi cleared Eduardo's goalbound header from Mladen Petrić's long free-kick. Six minutes later Petrić dispossessed Monaco's Maicon and fizzed a fierce shot narrowly wide. Monaco playmaker Camel Meriem tested Pascal Zuberbühler in the 31st minute, and teenager Serge Gakpé was close to scoring on his European debut as the visitors pressed. Petrić, Matías Delgado and Mile Sterjovski all threatened Guillaume Warmuz's goal early in the second half, while the Monaco keeper also frustrated Bruno Berner and Petrić again before he was finally beaten by David Degen, the midfielder finishing coolly following Eduardo's pass in the 78th minute.

AS Monaco return match (23 February 2006)
After being eliminated from the Champions League in the third qualifying round back in August, Monaco president Michal Pastor had made UEFA Cup success the club's main priority, saying: "We must win it. It's a question of honour." AS Monaco FC's pledge to win the UEFA Cup this season was broken as FC Basel 1893's Swedish defender Daniel Majstorović secured a priceless equaliser at the Stade Louis II. The home side had been handed a 21st-minute lead when on-loan striker Christian Vieri converted from the penalty spot after Jaroslav Plašil was brought down by Matías Delgado. However, Basel took what proved to be the decisive advantage eleven minutes into the second period as Mladen Petrić's cross from the left was headed by Majstorović past Flavio Roma to leave Monaco needing at least two goals for victory. While substitute Olivier Kapo had a couple of good efforts late on, but Basel's nerve held and another goal was not scored. Basel won 2-1 on aggregate.

RC Strasbourg (9 March 2006)
Then, in the round of 16 Basel were drawn against Strasbourgh and were able to revenge themselves for the defeat in the Group stage. Matías Delgado scored one and set up the other as the Swiss side took the initiative, right from the start. Just eight minutes had elapsed when Argentinian midfielder Delgado picked himself up after an Edgar Loué foul and curled a superb free-kick around the wall to break the deadlock. The French team fought back in the second half, before Zdravko Kuzmanovic scored following another Delgado free kick to secure a healthy two-goal lead to take to Stade de la Meinau a week later.

RC Strasbourg return match (16 March 2006)
In the Stade de la Meinau in front of just 8,000 spectators, Brazilian striker Eduardo gave the visitors a third-minute advantage, tapping in Mladen Petrić's unselfish square ball. However, Rudy Carlier soon levelled for the home team. That lifted Strasbourg and Alexander Farnerud saw three efforts denied, before Eduardo destroyed their hopes with an emphatic volley from David Degen's left-wing cross. There were still only 26 minutes on the clock and although the game calmed down before half-time, Basel began the second period with renewed verve as Boris Smiljanić and Mile Sterjovski forced impressive saves from Nicolas Puydebois. Cédric Kanté eventually made it 2-2 at the other end with 12 minutes remaining, but it was too little, too late as the Swiss side progressed to the quarter-finals.

Middlesbrough (30 March 2006)
Basel were drawn against Middlesbrough in the quarter-finals and played the first leg at home at St. Jakob-Park. Two goals just before half-time inflicted a serious blow to the English Premiership side as Basel made the best of difficult conditions. On 43 minutes Matías Delgado collected his seventh goal of the competition when his hopeful long-range effort took a wicked bounce off the greasy surface and arced over the unfortunate Mark Schwarzer. The Australian international was beaten again before the interval as David Degen earned Basel a valuable first-leg two goal cushion. It was a deserved strike for Degen, whose tireless running proved a constant threat to the visitors' shaky defence. After Eduardo glanced a header wide on ten minutes, he was given a clearer opening when he met Degen's pullback, before testing Schwarzer with a shot on the turn. Middlesbrough, meanwhile, were limited to half-chances as Jimmy Floyd Hasselbaink drove a free-kick off target midway through the half, while a swerving attempt from Gaizka Mendieta forced Pascal Zuberbühler to tip over. With opportunities at a premium for Middlesbrough, Basel were rewarded for their endeavour through Delgado's opener, before Degen outpaced a sluggish back line to latch on to Eduardo's through-ball and drill a low shot beyond Schwarzer. The timing was terrible for Steve McClaren's men, but they responded well after the break. Hasselbaink drew a diving stop from Zuberbühler three minutes into the second period and Chris Riggott went even closer as he met a corner with a towering header. It cannoned off the crossbar, however, and Delgado repeated the feat at the other end with a free-kick as the game opened up. Riggott was on more familiar defensive duty on 70 minutes, his goalline block denying substitute Scott Chipperfield.

Middlesbrough return match (6 April 2006)
Travelling to the Riverside Stadium for the return match, Basel took an early lead. Christian Gross' Basel always looked in control, having earned a 2-0 victory on home soil during the previous week, and their grip on the tie was further strengthened by Eduardo's close-range finish midway through the first half. Mark Viduka struck twice either side of half-time to breathe fresh life into the Middlesbrough's challenge, however, and when Jimmy Floyd Hasselbaink found the net with a thunderous strike moments after the dismissal of Basel's Swedish defender Daniel Majstorovic, the momentum was with the home side. With time almost up, Massimo Maccarone slid in the winning goal from a tight angle to crown a remarkable comeback and earn a last-four tie against FC Steaua Bucuresti. The home team came close to halving their deficit in the opening seconds as Pascal Zuberbühler failed to collect George Boateng's high ball under pressure from Yakubu Ayegbeni, but the Nigerian international's angled shot towards the unguarded goal rolled into the side-netting. Basel then served notice of their attacking intent as Mile Sterjovski was left unmarked from a free-kick to flick an effort wide, but Middlesbrough failed to heed the warning and another set-piece proved their undoing in the 23rd minute, Boris Smiljanić nodding Mladen Petrić's free-kick across goal for Eduardo to tap in at the far post. That left the home side needing to score four times to stay in the competition, and they replied rapidly as Yakubu's physical presence unsettled the Basel defence and Viduka collected the loose ball before drilling a shot past Zuberbühler. The Basel goalkeeper preserved his side's two-goal aggregate advantage as the interval approached, however, stretching to palm Yakubu's effort around the post after a slick passing move had sliced open the visitors.

Urged on by tremendous home support Middlesbrough began the second period in frenetic fashion, with half-time substitute Hasselbaink and Viduka both forcing Zuberbühler into action. However, the Basel goalkeeper was powerless three minutes before the hour, Viduka collecting Yakubu's defence-splitting pass and rounding the goalkeeper to roll in before Majstorovic was sent off for a second bookable offence. Hasselbaink raised home hopes almost immediately with a thunderous shot from the edge of the area and just as it seemed Basel would hold out, Zuberbühler parried Fábio Rochemback's effort and Maccarone slid in the rebound from an acute angle to spark wild celebrations. Middlesbrough had fought back to win the match 4–1 and the tie 4–3.

Conclusion
Middlesbrough beat Steaua București 4–3 in the semi-final and advanced to the final, but here they were beaten 4–0 by Sevilla. In spite of being knocked out in the quarter-finals, the cup run was considered a success for Basel. Matías Emilio Delgado ended the 2005–06 UEFA Cup season as the contest's top goal scorer.

Club

Management

Kit

|
|

Other information

Players

First team squad

Transfers

Summer

In

Out

Winter

In

Out

Results

Friendlies

Pre-season

Winter break friendlies

Swiss Super League

First half of season

Second half of season

Final league table

Swiss Cup

2005–06 Swiss Cup

UEFA Champions League
For more information, see 2005–06 UEFA Champions League

Third qualifying round

Werder Bremen won 4–2 on aggregate.

UEFA Cup

First round
All times CET

Basel won 6-0 on aggregate.

Group stage / Group E

Round of 32

Basel won 2–1 on aggregate.

Round of 16

Basel won 4-2 on aggregate.

Quarter-finals

Middlesbrough won 4-3 on aggregate.

References

Sources
 Rotblau: Jahrbuch Saison 2015/2016. Publisher: FC Basel Marketing AG. 
 Rotblau: Jahrbuch Saison 2017/2018. Publisher: FC Basel Marketing AG. 
 Die ersten 125 Jahre / 2018. Publisher: Josef Zindel im Friedrich Reinhardt Verlag, Basel. 
 FCB squad 2005–06 at fcb-archiv.ch
 Switzerland 2005–06 at RSSSF

External links
 FC Basel official site

FC Basel seasons
Basel